Women of Breakwater, also known as Woman of Breakwater or Babae sa Breakwater in Tagalog is a 2003 Filipino drama film directed by Mario O'Hara and starring Katherine Luna. The film is a moving insight into the squalor and poverty of inner-city life in the Philippines. As a tragic tale, it covers a whole plethora of emotions surrounding the lives of some of the poorest people in Manila portrayed in the film.

Plot

Basilio (Kristoffer King) escapes provincial Leyte to the slums of Manila with his younger brother Buboy (Alcris Galura). Residing in the shanty town tenements beneath the tourist-infested breakwater and seawalls of the city, Basilio falls in love with a prostitute named Paquita (Katherine Luna).

Paquita started whoring early in life that at her relatively young age she's already "played out", her body full of sexual diseases and open sores. But their relationship is troubled only by the apparent poverty and the more impending threat of the slums' jealous protector, ex-cop Dave (Gardo Versoza).

Cast
Katherine Luna as Paquita
Kristoffer King as Basilio
Gardo Versoza as Dave Pilay
Amy Austria as Jovy
Alcris Galura as Buboy
Yoyoy Villame as Pulubi
Evelyn Vargas
Jeanette Nunag as Mariposa
Lou Veloso as Igme
Lucita Soriano as Aning
Rez Cortez as Foreman
Odette Khan as Marta
Daniel Fernando as Tatay
Nonong de Andres as Taong Grasa
Lilia Cuntapay as Serena

References

External links
 

2003 films
Philippine drama films
2000s Tagalog-language films
2003 drama films
Filipino-language films
Films directed by Mario O'Hara